EARN or Earn may refer to:

EARN
 European Academic and Research Network, a defunct computer networking organisation succeeded by TERENA (Trans-European Research and Education Networking Association)
 Economic Analysis and Research Network, a nationwide (U.S.) network of state and local organizations affiliated with the Economic Policy Institute
 European Asteroid Research Node, an association of asteroid research groups (see Minor planet)

Earn
 Loch Earn, lake in Scotland 
 River Earn, river in Scotland 
 Bridge of Earn, town in Perthshire, Scotland 
 Earn out, in the purchase of a company etc.
Carl Earn (1921–2007), American tennis player

See also
 Earning (disambiguation)